The Chamber of Deputies of Santa Cruz Province is the unicameral legislative body of Santa Cruz Province, in Argentina. It convenes in the provincial capital, Río Gallegos.

It comprises 24 legislators, 10 of whom are elected in a single province-wide multi-member district through proportional representation using the D'Hondt method, while the remaining 14 are elected in single-member districts roughly corresponding with the province's municipalities. Elections also use the ley de lemas. The entirety of the Chamber's members are renewed every four years. In addition, party lists employ vertical gender parity.

Its powers and attributions are established in the provincial constitution. The Chamber of Deputies is presided by the Vice Governor of Santa Cruz, who is elected alongside the governor every four years. Since 2019, Eugenio Quiroga of the Justicialist Party has been vice governor of Santa Cruz, serving alongside Governor Alicia Kirchner.

Electoral districts
14 of the 24 members of the Chamber of Deputies are elected in single-member constituencies roughly corresponding to the municipalities of Santa Cruz.

References

External links
 
Constitution of Santa Cruz Province 

1956 establishments in Argentina
Politics of Argentina
Santa Cruz Province, Argentina
Santa Cruz